This is a list of events from British radio in 1937.

Events
12 May – Coronation of King George VI and Queen Elizabeth at Westminster Abbey in London. The BBC makes its first outside broadcast covering the event.
20 May – Commentating on the illumination of the naval ships at the Coronation Review of the Fleet at Spithead for the BBC, lieutenant commander Thomas Woodrooffe, having enjoyed hospitality on his old ship HMS Nelson, rambles, repeating variations of the phrase "the whole Fleet's lit up", until the broadcast is faded out early.
4 July – Following the alteration of frequencies at the BBC's Washford transmitter to enable it to radiate separate regional services for Wales and the West of England, a new Welsh Regional Programme begins, broadcast from Washford on 1050 kHz and Penmon on 804 kHz.
19 October – The BBC Regional Programme for the North East and Cumbria (a variant of the North Region) begins transmissions from Stagshaw. It will broadcast a documentary Hadrian's Wall with script by W. H. Auden
25 November – The Inter Regional Spelling Competition is broadcast in the BBC Children's Hour, origin of regular quiz Regional Round.

Births
16 February – Peter Hobday, broadcast news presenter (died 2020)
13 May – Trevor Baylis, inventor of the windup radio (died 2018)
20 July – Michael Oliver, radio arts presenter (died 2002)
9 November – Roger McGough, poet and radio presenter
10 or 30 December – Piers Plowright, radio documentary producer (died 2021)
11 December – Stephen Moore, actor (The Hitchhiker's Guide to the Galaxy) (died 2019)

References 

 
Years in British radio
Radio